Oceana may refer to:
 Oceana (singer), a German singer
 Oceana (album), an album by Derek Sherinian
 Oceana (band), an American post-hardcore band
 Oceana (nightclub), a chain of nightclubs in the United Kingdom
 Oceana (non-profit group), an ocean conservation group
 MV Oceana, a cruise ship
 Oceana Publications, a U.S. law publisher
 Oceàna (opera), by Antonio Smareglia
 The Commonwealth of Oceana, a 1656 political tract by James Harington
 Oceana, a musical project produced by Manny Lehman
 224 Oceana, an asteroid in the asteroid belt
 "Oceana", a song by the 3rd and the Mortal from the album Tears Laid in Earth

Places
 Oceana, West Virginia
 Oceana County, Michigan
 Oceana, Virginia, neighborhood of Virginia Beach, Virginia
 Naval Air Station Oceana, a military airport located in Virginia Beach, Virginia
 Oceana, a city in the episode "Deep Freeze" of Batman: The Animated Series

See also
 Ocean (disambiguation)
 Oceania (disambiguation)